Ammonitella yatesii, the tight coin, is a species of small, air-breathing land snail, a terrestrial pulmonate gastropod mollusc in the family Megomphicidae. This species is endemic to the United States. 

The shell in this species is very tightly coiled, hence the common name.

References

Molluscs of the United States
yatesii
Gastropods described in 1869
Taxonomy articles created by Polbot